South Kesteven is a local government district in Lincolnshire, England, forming part of the traditional Kesteven division of the county. The 2011 census reported a population of 133,788 people. The administrative centre of the district is Grantham.

A scheduled monument is a nationally important archaeological site or monument which is given legal protection by being placed on a list (or "schedule") by the Secretary of State for Culture, Media and Sport; Historic England takes the leading role in identifying such sites. The legislation governing this is the Ancient Monuments and Archaeological Areas Act 1979. The term "monument" can apply to the whole range of archaeological sites, and they are not always visible above ground. Such sites have to have been deliberately constructed by human activity. They range from prehistoric standing stones and burial sites, through Roman remains and medieval structures such as castles and monasteries, to later structures such as industrial sites and buildings constructed for the World Wars or the Cold War.

There are 92 scheduled monuments in South Kesteven.  Some of the oldest are Neolithic, Bronze Age or Iron Age including hill forts and bowl barrows. The Romano-British period is represented with several sites including the town of Ancaster and sections of major Roman engineering works such as the Car Dyke and Ermine Street. Religious sites are represented by Sempringham Priory, which was the founding location of the only purely English religious order, the Gilbertines; the list also includes Witham Preceptory, a Knights Templar preceptory between North and South Witham, and several friaries in the ancient town of Stamford. More recent sites include several motte-and-bailey castles such as Bytham Castle and many village and churchyard standing crosses dating to the Middle Ages. The most recent monuments include two stone arch bridges built in the 16th and 17th centuries, and a village pump and milestone constructed near Normanton circa 1800.

Three of the sites are located in more than one jurisdiction. The Deeping Gate Bridge crosses the River Welland into Cambridgeshire, the Neolithic settlement site east of Uffington and Barnack station straddles the boundary between Lincolnshire and Cambridgeshire, and Kennulph's Stone is a tripoint boundary marker at the intersection of South Kesteven, South Holland and the City of Peterborough.

Except where noted, the monuments are listed below using the titles given in the Historic England data sheets.

Monuments

See also

 Scheduled Monuments in Lincolnshire
 Grade I listed buildings in South Kesteven
 Grade II* listed buildings in South Kesteven

Notes

References

Archaeological sites in Lincolnshire
History of Lincolnshire
South Kesteven
Lists of buildings and structures in Lincolnshire